Diana Thomas may refer to:

 Diana Thomas (mathematician), American mathematician and nutrionist
 Diana Thomas (politician), American politician and writer
 Diana Thomas (writer), English journalist and novelist

See also 

 Diane Thomas, American screenwriter